The 2nd Space Operations Squadron (2 SOPS) is a United States Space Force unit responsible for operating the Global Positioning System (GPS) satellite constellation, which provides global navigation, time transfer, and nuclear detonation detection. It is a component of Space Operations Command's Space Delta 8 and headquartered at Schriever Space Force Base, Colorado.

The squadron is augmented by reserve personnel from the 19th Space Operations Squadron, part of the 310th Space Wing.

Mission
The squadron performs the command and control mission for the Global Positioning System satellite constellation. GPS is the world's premiere space-based position, velocity and timing system, capable of providing precision navigation and timing capability simultaneously to an unlimited number of properly equipped users. Continuous GPS availability and unprecedented signal accuracy has resulted in widespread integration of the technology; numerous military, commercial and international users have embraced GPS.

History
The squadron was originally constituted as the 2d Surveillance Squadron and activated on 16 January 1962 under North American Air Defense Command. It was then organized on 1 February 1962 at Ent Air Force Base under the 9th Aerospace Defense Division, under which it operated SPACETRACK, the USAF globe-spanning space surveillance network, from 1962 through 1967. The squadron was inactivated on 1 January 1967.

It was redesignated the 2d Satellite Control Squadron as the first operational squadron of the 2d Space Wing. It was activated at Falcon Air Force Station on 1 October 1985.

The squadron has controlled the NAVSTAR Global Positioning System satellite constellation and managed the Nuclear Detonation System in support of the Nuclear Test Ban Treaty since 1987.

On 30 January 1992, as part of an Air Force reorganization, 2 SCS was redesignated the 2d Space Operations Squadron.

On June 18, 2004, a 24/7 user focal point, the GPSOC, was established.

In late 2005, several National Geospatial-Intelligence Agency monitor stations were integrated into the network to improve navigation accuracy and signal monitoring.

The unit had one geographically separated unit, Detachment 1, at Cape Canaveral Air Force Station, Florida. It was responsible for maintenance of a GPS Ground Antenna, Monitor Station, and various operational test assets. It is now discontinued, though contractors remained to perform the mission.

Lineage
 Constituted as the 2d Surveillance Squadron (Sensor) and activated, on 16 January 1962 (not organized)
 Organized on 1 February 1962 
 Discontinued and inactivated on 1 January 1967
 Redesignated 2d Satellite Control Squadron on 16 Jul 1985
 Activated on 1 October 1985
 Redesignated 2d Space Operations Squadron on 30 Jan 1992

Assignments
 Air Defense Command, 16 January 1962 (not organized)
 9th Aerospace Defense Division, 1 February 1962 – 1 January 1967
 2d Space Wing, 1 October 1985
 50th Operations Group, 30 January 1992 – 24 July 2020
 Space Delta 8, 2020 - Present

Stations
 Ent Air Force Base, Colorado, 1 February 1962 – 1 January 1967
 Falcon Air Force Station (later Falcon Air Force Base, Schriever Space Force Base), Colorado, 1 October 1985 – present

Decorations
Air Force Outstanding Unit Award
 1 June 1964 – 31 May 1966
 1 December 1987 – 30 November 1989
 1 September 1990 – 31 August 1991

List of commanders

 Lt Col Steven C. Stadler, October 1985 – April 1988
 Lt Col Barry R. Springer, April 1988 – April 1989
 Lt Col Michael E. Shaw, April 1989 – August 1990
 Lt Col William L. Shelton, August 1990 – June 1992
 Lt Col Harrison C. Freer, June 1992 – June 1994
 Lt Col Frank M. DeArmond, June 1994 – January 1995
 Maj Thomas A. Shircliff, January 1995 – March 1995
 Lt Col Roger C. Hunter, March 1995 – October 1996
 Lt Col Joseph P. Squatrito, October 1996 – July 1998
 Lt Col James K. McLaughlin, July 1998 – June 2000
 Lt Col Daniel P. Jordan, June 2000 – July 2002
 Lt Col Scott A. Henderson, July 2002 – July 2004
 Lt Col Stephen T. Hamilton, July 2004 – uly 2006
 Lt Col Kurt W. Kuntzleman, July 2006 – August 2008
 Lt Col DeAnna M. Burt, August 2008 – August 2010
 Lt Col Jennifer L. Grant, August 2010 – June 2012
 Lt Col Thomas Ste. Marie, June 2012 – July 2014
 Lt Col Todd Benson, July 2014 – June 2016
 Lt Col Peter C. Norsky, June 2016 – 1 June 2018
 Lt Col Stephen A. Toth, 1 June 2018 – June 2020
 Lt Col Michael K. Schriever, June 2020 – 6 July 2022
 Lt Col Robert O. Wray, 6 July 2022 – present

See also
 19th Space Operations Squadron

References
 Notes

 Citations

Bibliography

External links
 50th Space Wing Public Affairs: Schriever AFB
 GPS Operations Center

Squadrons of the United States Space Force
Military units and formations in Colorado
Global Positioning System